Steven Carpenter (born January 22, 1958) is a former American football defensive back who played for the New York Jets and the St. Louis Cardinals of the National Football League (NFL). He played college football at Western Illinois University.

References 

1958 births
Living people
American football defensive backs
Western Illinois Leathernecks football players
New York Jets players
St. Louis Cardinals (football) players
Calgary Stampeders players